The 1811 Connecticut gubernatorial election took place on April 8, 1811.

Incumbent Federalist Governor John Treadwell was defeated by Roger Griswold, a Federalist who received the support of the Democratic-Republican Party.

General election

Candidates
Roger Griswold, Federalist, incumbent Lieutenant Governor
John Treadwell, Federalist, incumbent Governor

Both candidates were Federalists; Griswold was supported by the Democratic-Republicans.

Contemporary sources indicate that Treadwell was supported by the  established church while Griswold was supported by lawyers.

Results

References

Gubernatorial
Connecticut
1811